Antoni Palau Dulcet  (Montblanc, 1867 - Barcelona, 1954), librarian and bibliographer, author of the monumental  Manual del librero hispano americano (Hispanic American bookseller Manual , 1923-1945),  Conca de Barbera  (1912),and numerous guides from "Montblanc, Poblet i la Conca" (1930-1932).

Biography
He investigated the introduction of press in Spain in the De los orígenes de la imprenta y su introducción en España ( From the origins of printing and its introduction in Spain ), 1952.

He is best known as the author of an indispensable Manual del librero hispano-americano: inventario bibliográfico de la producción científica y literaria de España y de la América Latina desde la invención de la imprenta hasta nuestros días, con el valor comercial de todos los artículos descritos (1923-1945), en siete volúmenes ( Handbook of the Spanish-American bookseller: bibliographic survey of scientific and literary production of Spain and Latin America since the invention of printing to our days, with the market value of all the items described  (1923-1945), in seven volumes).

In its second edition it consisted of 28 volumes published between 1948 and 1977 and seven volumes of indices between 1981 and 1987 by Agustín Palau Claveras with: Alphabetical title-materials, corrections and additions connections, a total of 35 volumes.

He also prepared bibliographies of Miguel de Cervantes and Francisco de Quevedo and an interesting autobiography, Memòries d'un llibreter català ( Memoirs of a Catalan bookseller ) (1935), which demonstrates his humanist spirit and Cultural altruistic desire.

He was named favorite son of  Montblanc in 1949. On 31 July 1949, the mayor of the "Vila Ducal" , Jose Maria Abelló Barrios handed him the silver medal.

 Work 
 El Año artístico y literario en Barcelona 1895 Barcelona: Establecimiento Tipográfico, 1896
 Bibliografia cronològica de Balmes Barcelona: Imp. Fills de Jepús, 1915
 Bibliografía de Cervantes con el valor commercial de las obras descritas por Antonio Palau y Dulcet Barcelona: Librería anticuaria, 1924
 Bibliografía de don Miguel de Cervantes Saavedra Barcelona: Librería Palau, Asociación de libreros y amigos del libro, 1950
 Bibliografía de la Conca de Barberà Barcelona, 1915
 La biblioteca del Marquès de Lió: notícia Barcelona: Llibreria Antiquària d'Antoni Palau, 1909
 Conca de Barbarà Barcelona: Impremta Romana, 1931-1932
 1 - Guia de Montblanch Barcelona: Impremta Romana, 1931
 II - Guia de Poblet Barcelona: Impremta Romana, 1931
 III - Guia de la Conca Barcelona: Impremta Romana, 1932 (edició facsímil Montblanc: Consell Comarcal de la Conca de Barberà, 2007 )
 La Conca de Barberá: monografía histórica y descriptiva Barcelona: Francesc Altés impressor, 1912
 De llibres i llibreters Barcelona: Antonio Palau, 1924
 Librería anticuaria de Antonio Palau Barcelona: Antonio Palau, 1909
 Manual del librero hispano-americano: inventario bibliográfico de la producción científica y literaria de España y de la América Latina desde la invención de la imprenta hasta nuestro días, con el valor comercial de todos los artículos descritos Barcelona: Libreria Anticuaria, 1923-1927. 7 volums
 Edició facsímil Manual del librero hispano-americano: inventario bibliográfico de la producción científica y literaria de España y de la América Latina desde la invención de la imprenta hasta nuestro días, con el valor comercial de todos los artículos descritos. En 7 volums, Madrid: Julio Ollero, 1990 , reimpresa el 2004 )
 Manual del librero hispano-americano: bibliografía general española e hispano-americana desde la invención de la imprenta hasta nuestros tiempos, con el valor comercial de los impresos descritos 2a ed. corregida. Barcelona : Librería Palau, 1948-1977. 28 volums
 Agustín Palau Claveras Índice alfabético de títulos-materias, correcciones, conexiones y adiciones del Manual del Librero Hispanoamericano de Antonio Palau Dulcet Empúries: Palacete Palau Dulcet; Oxford: The Dolphin Book, 1981-1987  (v. 1), 8430071695 (v. 2), 8430094822 (v. 3), 8439811594 (v. 4), 8439835493 (v. 5), 8439857969 (v. 6), 8439884958 (v. 7)
 Agustín Palau Claveras Addenda & corrigenda o Volúmen complementario del tomo primero del Manual del librero hispanoamericano de Antonio Palau y Dulcet Barcelona: Palacete Palau y Dulcet, 1990 
 Memorias de libreros Madrid: Librería para bibliófilos, 1949
 Memòries d'un llibreter català Barcelona: Llibreria Catalònia, 1935
 Edició castellana Memorias de un librero catalan, 1867-1935 Barcelona: Llibreria Catalònia, 1935
 Los orígenes de la imprenta en España Barcelona; Palau, 1948
 De los origenes de la imprenta y su introducción en España Barcelona: Librería Palau, 1952
 Refranes castellanos y sentencias de los Santos Padres: texto del siglo XVIII Barcelona: Imp. Ràfols, 1928
 La Semana Santa en Montblanch en 1928 Barcelona: Impremta Ràfols, 1928
 La vespra de Sant Joan a Montblanch en 1927 Montblanch: Cal Sala, 1927

 Bibliography Antoni Palau i Dulcet i Josep Porter i Rovira: dos montblanquins apassionats pels llibres''. Montblanc: Centre d'Estudis de la Conca de Barberà. Col·lecció biografies 2. 2007.

See also 
 La Cartografía Mallorquina
 Memorias históricas (Capmany)
 Història de la Marina Catalana
 Mestre Jácome
 Abraham Cresques
 Arte de navegar
 Antonio de Capmany
 Próspero de Bofarull y Mascaró

References 

1867 births
1954 deaths
Writers from Barcelona
20th-century Spanish historians